Bossiaea decumbens is a spreading, prostrate shrub in the pea family (Fabaceae), and is endemic to Victoria. It has alternate, variable shaped leaves and  yellow pea flowers with red splotches from spring to late summer.

Description
The stems are needle-shaped with scant, flattened or spreading hairs. The leaf lower surface is smooth with mostly obvious venation and the edges curved, on a short petiole. The stipules are triangular, thin and much longer than the petiole. Flowering occurs from September to February.

Taxonomy and naming
Bossiaea decumbens was first formally described by Ferdinand von Mueller in 1858 and the description was published in  Fragmenta Phytographiae Australiae. The specific epithet (decumbens) is derived from  Latin meaning "prostrate".

Distribution and habitat
This species is found at higher altitudes in Victoria in a variety of growing conditions in woodlands, heath, sclerophyll forests and grassland locations.

References 

decumbens
Flora of Victoria (Australia)
Plants described in 1858
Taxa named by Ferdinand von Mueller